Henry Bethune may refer to:

 Norman Bethune (Henry Norman Bethune, 1890–1939), Canadian physician, medical innovator and Anti-fascist
 Henry Bethune (cricketer) (1844–1912), English cricketer
 Henry Lindsay Bethune (1787–1851), English officer